Amir Kadri Rrahmani (born 24 February 1994) is an Albanian professional footballer who plays as a centre-back for  club Napoli and captains the Kosovo national team.

Club career

Drenica
Rrahmani began his football career with the youth team of Drenica, where he was promoted to the senior team during the 2011–12 campaign where he immediately began to impress despite being only 17 years old. He went on trial with Albanian Superliga side Kastrioti Krujë in the summer of 2012, where he impressed the coaching staff at Kastrioti Krujë but a deal to sign the player could not be agreed after negotiations stalled over a compensation package which was reported to be in the region of €3,000. He returned to KF Drenica where he became an important first team player as he helped his side finish just above the relegation playoff zone in the Superleague of Kosovo. His contract expired at the end of the 2012–13 season and he was allowed to leave Drenica on a free transfer.

Partizani Tirana
Rrahmani was subject to interest by a host of Albanian Superliga sides, with the reigning champions Skënderbeu Korçë formally offering the 19-year-old a contract to join the club, but he would ultimately decide to join Partizani Tirana instead. He made his debut for his new club on 21 September 2013 in an away game against Besa Kavajë, where he came on as a substitute after half time in the 1–0 win for his side.

At the end of 2014–15 season, Rrahmani was named "Talent of the Year" by association "Sporti na bashkon".

RNK Split
On 5 June 2015, Rrahmani finished his career at Partizani Tirana and moved to Croatian side RNK Split, where he joined the fellow Albanian player Sokol Cikalleshi. He made his competitive debut for the club on 13 July in the opening league match of 2015–16 season against Lokomotiva, where he played full-90 minutes in a 2–1 home win. Following that, Rrahmani become a regular starter in Zoran Vulić and later Goran Sablić lineup, establish himself in the center of defence.

On 30 October, Rrahmani made a solid performance against the league leaders Dinamo Zagreb for a 1–0 home win, which lead him to be named in the Team of the Week. On 22 November, following his good display in the 1–1 away draw against Istra 1961, Rrahmani was named again in the Team of the Week.

Rrahmani commenced 2016 by playing full-90 minutes in the team's first league match of 2016, a 1–1 away draw against Inter Zaprešić, which was followed by another full-90 minutes against Zagreb, which lead him to be named again in the Team of the Week. On 2 March 2016, Rrrahmani netted his first goal for the club during the 1–2 home defeat to Rijeka. This lead him to another Team of the Week selection. Rrahmani continued with his solid appearances which led to his value rising to an estimated €1 million. He was named again in the Team of the Week for the 8th time following a goalless draw against Osijek on 8 April.

Dinamo Zagreb
On 30 August 2016, Rrahmani joined with champion of Croatian First Football League side Dinamo Zagreb. Dinamo Zagreb reportedly paid a €1.6 million transfer fee.

Loan at Lokomativa
Eight days after the transfer to Dinamo Zagreb, Rrahmani joined with another Croatian First Football League side Lokomotiva, on a season-long loan. On 11 September 2016, he made his debut in a 2–3 away win against Slaven Belupo after being named in the starting line-up.

Return from loan
On 21 June 2017, Rrahmani returned to Croatian First Football League side Dinamo Zagreb. A month later, he made his debut in a 4–0 home win against Cibalia after coming on as a substitute at 68th minute in place of Filip Benković.

Hellas Verona
On 26 June 2019, Rrahmani joined Serie A side Hellas Verona, on a four-year contract. Hellas Verona reportedly paid around €2 million transfer fee. One day later, the club confirmed that Rrahmani had joined on a permanent transfer. On 18 August 2019, he made his debut with Hellas Verona in the third round of 2019–20 Coppa Italia against Cremonese after being named in the starting line-up.

Napoli
On 20 January 2020, Rrahmani joined Serie A side Napoli. Napoli reportedly paid a €14 million transfer fee.

Return to Hellas Verona as loan
On 20 January 2020, Rrahmani was sent back on loan to Serie A club Hellas Verona for the remainder of the season, with the club paying wages of £8,000 per week. Six days later, he played the first game after the return against Lecce after being named in the starting line-up.

Return from loan
On 24 August 2020, Rrahmani returned to Serie A side Napoli. On 3 January 2021, he made his debut in a 1–4 away win against Cagliari after coming on as a substitute at 87th minute in place of Kostas Manolas.

International career
Being of Albanian descent from Kosovo, Rrahmani received Albanian citizenship on 4 June 2013 among Albania senior side member Agon Mehmeti, and fellow Albania U21 players Haxhi Neziraj, Valentin Gjokaj and Herolind Shala.

Albania U21
Principally Rrahmani was called up by Skënder Gega for a friendly match of the Albania U21 side against Macedonia in February 2013. He came as a later upcoming in the Albania U21's last 4 matches for the 2015 UEFA European Under-21 Championship in last four months of the tournament, exactly from August to November 2013.

Kosovo
Rrahmani was capped once for the Kosovo national team in a sanctioned match by FIFA on 21 May 2014 against Senegal, where he played the full 90 minutes in a 3–1 loss.

Albania
Following his good performances at both Partizani Tirana and the Albania under-21 side, Rrahmani was called up by the Albania senior side coach Gianni De Biasi for a friendly match on 8 June 2014 against San Marino. He made his debut against the side after coming on as a substitute in place of fellow 20-year-old defender Elseid Hysaj in the 82nd minute of the match, which finished in a 0–3 away victory. On 13 November 2015, Rrahmani scored against Kosovo, a team which he previously played for.

Career statistics

Club

International

Scores and results list Albania's and Kosovo's goal tally first, score column indicates score after each Rrahmani goal.

Honours
Individual
Albanian Superliga Talent of the Year: 2014 3rd place, 2015

References

External links
Profile at the S.S.C. Napoli website

1994 births
Living people
Sportspeople from Pristina
Kosovo Albanians
Association football central defenders
Kosovan footballers
Kosovo international footballers
Kosovan expatriate footballers
Kosovan expatriate sportspeople in Croatia
Kosovan expatriate sportspeople in Italy
Albanian footballers
Albania youth international footballers
Albania under-21 international footballers
Albania international footballers
Albanian expatriate footballers
Albanian expatriate sportspeople in Croatia
Albanian expatriate sportspeople in Italy
Dual internationalists (football)
Football Superleague of Kosovo players
KF Drenica players
Kategoria Superiore players
FK Partizani Tirana players
Croatian Football League players
RNK Split players
GNK Dinamo Zagreb players
NK Lokomotiva Zagreb players
Serie A players
Hellas Verona F.C. players